Proutiella is a genus of moths of the family Notodontidae. It consists of these species:
 Proutiella esoterica (Prout, 1918)
 Proutiella ilaire (Druce, 1885)
 Proutiella infans (Walker, 1856)
 Proutiella jordani (Hering, 1925)
 Proutiella latifascia (Prout, 1920)
 Proutiella repetita (Warren, 1905)
 Proutiella simplex (Walker, 1856)
 Proutiella tegyra (Druce, 1899)
 Proutiella vittula (Hübner, 1823)

Notodontidae of South America